Val Terbi is a municipality in the district of Delémont in the canton of Jura in Switzerland.  The municipalities of Montsevelier, Vermes and Vicques merged on 1 January 2013 into the new municipality of Val Terbi. On 1 January 2018 the former municipality of Corban merged into the municipality of Val Terbi.

History
Montsevelier is first mentioned in 1136 as Muzivilir.  The municipality was formerly known by its German name Mutzwil, however, that name is no longer used  Vermes is first mentioned in 866 as Vertima.  In 1308 it was mentioned as Vermunt.  Vicques is first mentioned in 866 as Vicum.

Geography
Of this area, about 43.5% is used for agricultural purposes, while 51.1% is forested. Of the rest of the land, 4.9% is settled (buildings or roads) and 0.6% is unproductive land. Of the agricultural land,  is used for orchards and vineyards,  is fields and grasslands and  consists of alpine grazing areas. Rivers and lakes cover  in the municipality.

The municipality of Corban chose to merge into Val Terbi on 1 January 2018.

Demographics
, 7.3% of the population are resident foreign nationals. Over the last 5 years (2010-2015) the population has changed at a rate of 2.62%. The birth rate in the municipality, in 2015, was 7.2, while the death rate was 8.0 per thousand residents.

, children and teenagers (0–19 years old) make up 23.9% of the population, while adults (20–64 years old) are 58.3% of the population and seniors (over 64 years old) make up 17.7%.  In 2015 there were 1,115 single residents, 1,186 people who were married or in a civil partnership, 148 widows or widowers and 177 divorced residents.

In 2015 there were 1,029 private households in Val Terbi with an average household size of 2.53 persons. In 2015 about 68.4% of all buildings in the municipality were single family homes, which is about the same as the percentage in the canton (66.9%) and greater than the percentage nationally (57.4%).  In 2014 the rate of construction of new housing units per 1000 residents was 2.65.  The vacancy rate for the municipality, was 0.72%.

Historic Population
The historical population is given in the following chart:

Sights
The entire village of Corban is designated as part of the Inventory of Swiss Heritage Sites.

Economy
Val Terbi is classed as a mixed agro-industrial community, a municipality where agriculture and manufacturing play a significant role in the economy.  The municipality is part of the agglomeration of Delémont.

, there were a total of 883 people employed in the municipality.  Of these, a total of 140 people worked in 49 businesses in the primary economic sector.  The secondary sector employed 297 workers in 45 separate businesses of which there were 4 small businesses with a total of 85 employees and one mid sized business also with 85 employees.  Finally, the tertiary sector provided 446 jobs in 106 businesses.

In 2015 a total of 2.7% of the population received social assistance.

In 2015 the average cantonal, municipal and church tax rate in the municipality for a couple with two children making  was 6.4% while the rate for a single person making  was 21.2%. The canton has a slightly higher than average tax rate for those making  and a slightly higher than average rate for those making .

Politics
In the 2015 federal election the most popular party was the SP with 24.7% of the vote.  The next three most popular parties were the CVP (23.6%), the CSP (17.1%) and the SVP (17.1%).  In the federal election, a total of 936 votes were cast, and the voter turnout was 47.5%.

Crime
In 2014 the crime rate, of the over 200 crimes listed in the Swiss Criminal Code (running from murder, robbery and assault to accepting bribes and election fraud), in Val Terbi was 31.3 per thousand residents.  This rate is only 62.4% of the cantonal rate and 48.5% of the average rate in the entire country.  During the same period no crimes or violations of immigration, visa or work permit laws have been perpetrated.

References

External links

Municipalities of the canton of Jura